"Life During Wartime" is a song by the American new wave band Talking Heads, released as the first single from their 1979 album Fear of Music. It peaked at #80 on the US Billboard Pop Singles Chart.

The song is also performed in the 1984 film Stop Making Sense, which depicts a Talking Heads concert. The performance featured in the film prominently features aerobic exercising and jogging by David Byrne and background singers. The Stop Making Sense live version of the track is featured in the film's accompanying soundtrack album. Its official title as a single, "Life During Wartime (This Ain't No Party... This Ain't No Disco... This Ain't No Foolin' Around)", makes it one of the longest-titled singles.

The song is included in The Rock and Roll Hall of Fame's 500 Songs that Shaped Rock and Roll.

Origin
In David Bowman's book This Must Be the Place: The Adventures of Talking Heads in the Twentieth Century Byrne is quoted as describing the genesis of the song:

Record World called it "a brilliant futuristic treatise on urban guerilla warfare."

AllMusic's Bill Janowitz reviewed the song, calling attention to its nearness to funk, saying that it is a "sort of apocalyptic punk/funk merge" comparable to Prince's later hit single "1999". In 2012, The New Yorker described "Life During Wartime" as, "an apocalyptic swamp-funk transmission in four-four time," adding "[it] is the band’s pinnacle, and the song is still a hell of a thing to hear."

Lyrics
The lyrics are told from the point of view of someone involved in clandestine activities in the U.S. (the cities Houston, Detroit, and Pittsburgh are mentioned) during some sort of civil unrest or dystopian environment.

The line "This ain't no Mudd Club or CBGB" refers to two New York music venues at which the band performed in the 1970s.

"The line 'This ain't no disco' sure stuck!" remarks Byrne in the liner notes of Once in a Lifetime: The Best of Talking Heads. "Remember when they would build bonfires of Donna Summer records? Well, we liked some disco music! It's called 'dance music' now. Some of it was radical, camp, silly, transcendent and disposable. So it was funny that we were sometimes seen as the flag-bearers of the anti-disco movement."

Charts

Chart runs
Billboard Hot 100 (5 weeks, entered November 3): Reached #80

Personnel
David Byrne - vocals, guitar
Jerry Harrison - synthesizers
Tina Weymouth - bass guitar
Chris Frantz - drums
Ari and Gene Wilder - congas

Other versions
An alternative mix of the song featuring heavy guitar was released on the 2005 compilation Talking Heads.

Live versions 

 1980 Remain in Light tour version, appeared on the 1982 live compilation album The Name Of This Band Is Talking Heads
 1983 Stop Making Sense tour version, appeared on the album and film of the same name.
 1992 David Byrne solo version, from the Between the Teeth film.
 2001 David Byrne solo version appeared on the 2007 album and film Live From Austin TX
 2003 David Byrne solo version appeared on the Live at Union Chapel film.
 2004 David Byrne and Caetano Veloso version, featured on the 2012 album Live at Carnegie Hall
 2009 David Byrne solo version, featuring in the 2010 film Ride, Rise, Roar

Cover versions 
The Staple Singers covered this song on their eponymous 1985 album.

References

External links

1979 singles
1983 singles
Talking Heads songs
Songs written by David Byrne
Sire Records singles
Song recordings produced by David Byrne
Song recordings produced by Brian Eno
Songs written by Jerry Harrison
Songs written by Chris Frantz
Songs written by Tina Weymouth
Live singles
1979 songs